Futbolilits is a 2011 Philippine television drama sports series broadcast by GMA Network. Directed by Mike Tuviera, it stars Julian Trono, Yogo Singh and Renz Valerio. It premiered on July 4, 2011 on the network's Telebabad line up replacing Magic Palayok. The series concluded on October 14, 2011 with a total of 75 episodes. It was replaced by Daldalita in its timeslot.

Cast and characters

Lead cast
 Julian Trono as Hero Melendez / Salvador / Francis Ocampo 
 Yogo Singh as Kikoy Estrella
 Renz Valerio as Sherwin Portero 

Supporting cast
 Raymart Santiago as Frankie Ocampo
 Jennylyn Mercado as Lani Melendez
 Angelika Dela Cruz as Belinda Almodovar
 Paolo Contis as Enrico Almodovar
 Isabel Frial as Tetang Cortes
 Nova Villa as Lola Ester Cortes
 Benjie Paras as Harrison Fortunato
 Daniel Matsunaga as Raphael Yamamoto
 Kokoy de Santos as Mercury "Merc" Almodovar
 Francis Magundayao as Diego Roxas
 Gabriel Roxas as Prince Dimagiba
 JM Reyes as Adonis Dimagiba
 Mosang as Beauty Dimagiba

Guest cast
 Vaness del Moral as Clarissa "Isay" Estrella
 Miggy Jimenez as Dagul Cordones
 Byron Ortile as Topakits de Lantero
 Jhiz Deocareza as Kulas Sonar
 Gene Padilla as Temio Dimagiba/Beauty's Husband
 Richard Quan as Danny Salvador
 Alyssa Alano as Gegay
 Debraliz Velasote as Yoya
 Freddie Webb as Sensei
 Miguel Tanfelix as Andy
 Isabelle Daza as Claudette
 Ehra Madrigal as Maricar Ocampo

Ratings
According to AGB Nielsen Philippines' Mega Manila household television ratings, the final episode of Futbolilits scored a 16.3% rating.

References

External links
 

2011 Philippine television series debuts
2011 Philippine television series endings
Filipino-language television shows
GMA Network drama series
Television shows set in the Philippines